Thom Browne (born September 27, 1965) is an American fashion designer. He is the founder and head of design for Thom Browne, a luxury fashion brand based in New York City. Browne debuted his womenswear collection in 2014.

Early life and education
Thom Browne was born in Allentown, Pennsylvania on September 27, 1965. He graduated from William Allen High School in Allentown and attended the University of Notre Dame, where he was a member of the track and field team and graduated with a degree in economics.

Career

Following an attempt at an acting career in Los Angeles, Browne moved to New York City in 1997, where he began working as a salesman at Armani. Club Monaco, then a Polo Ralph Lauren brand, later selected him to lead its creative development team, where he worked with American fashion designer Ralph Lauren. Browne led Club Monaco's design department for several years before launching the Thom Browne label.

Collaborations
In September 2006, Brooks Brothers announced its partnership with Browne as part of a guest designer program to create and distribute a 50-piece men's and women's high-end collection, Black Fleece by Brooks Brothers. Claudio Del Vecchio, chairman and chief executive officer of Brooks Brothers, said "Thom Browne's brilliant eye... his ability to foreshadow the market and offer a special look will bring a new dimension to Brooks Brothers."

The line appeared exclusively in 30 Brooks Brothers stores worldwide beginning in September 2007. In July 2008, Thom Browne and Brooks Brothers announced they would continue their partnership in the Black Fleece collection for another three years. Brooks Brothers opened a standalone Black Fleece store located in New York City's West Village. 

In 2008, Browne teamed up with the Italian sportswear company and down apparel specialist Moncler to design their men's top line Moncler Gamme Bleu, which launched in January 2009. The line was shown at Milan Fashion Week.

In September 2020, Browne made a scarf as part of Joe Biden's "Believe in Better" fashion collection, which included collaborations from 18 other fashion designers around the country as part of the Biden's 2020 presidential campaign. His scarf, along with the rest of the collection, was made in unionized factories and is available for purchase; all purchase proceeds were donated to Biden's presidential campaign.

Sale
In August 2018, Zegna purchased 85% of the brand for $500 million, which was seen as a bid by the century-old Italian company to court a younger demographic and reach new markets.. Browne continues to hold the remaining 15% ownership stake in the brand and has continued as its chief creative officer. Rodrigo Bazan remains the company's chief executive officer.

Awards and honors
GQ Designer of the Year, 2008 
Cooper Hewitt National Design Award, 2012
CFDA Menswear Designer of the Year Award, 2006, 2013, and 2016

Personal life
Browne lives with Andrew Bolton, who is curator at the Costume Institute of the Metropolitan Museum of Art in Manhattan. His older brother, Pat Browne, is a former member of the Pennsylvania State Senate and Governor-elect Josh Shapiro's nominee for Secretary of Revenue.

References

External links

1965 births
Living people
American fashion designers
American LGBT sportspeople
Artists from Allentown, Pennsylvania
Clothing brands of the United States
Gay sportsmen
High fashion brands
LGBT fashion designers
LGBT people from Pennsylvania
Menswear designers
Notre Dame College of Arts and Letters alumni
William Allen High School alumni